This list of tallest buildings in Louisville ranks skyscrapers in the United States city of Louisville, Kentucky by height. The tallest building in the city is 400 West Market, which rises 167 meters/550 feet. It was completed in 1993.



Tallest buildings

This list ranks Louisville skyscrapers that stand at least 37 meters tall, based on standard height measurement. This includes spires and architectural details but does not include antenna masts. Existing structures are included for ranking purposes based on present height.

Tallest under construction, approved and proposed

This lists buildings that are under construction, approved for construction or were proposed for construction in Louisville and are planned to rise at least , but are not yet completed structures. Under construction buildings that have already been topped out are also included.

Timeline of tallest buildings

See also
Tallest buildings in downtown Louisville
List of tallest buildings in Kentucky

References

 Emporis - Tallest buildings in Louisville
 

 
Louisville
Tallest in Louisville
Tallest buildings